Andrew Jackson is a former professional American football player who played running back for the Houston Oilers.

References

1964 births
American football running backs
Houston Oilers players
Iowa State Cyclones football players
Living people
Players of American football from Los Angeles
National Football League replacement players